Isthmus of Ak-Monay or Isthmus of Parpach  - restriction to 17 km of the Crimea Peninsula between Gulf of Feodosia (Black Sea) on South and Sivash and Bay of Arabat (Sea of Azov) on North. The isthmus connecting Kerch Peninsula to the mainland of Crimea.

The names was given by the former names of the villages Kamenskoe (Ak-Monay) and Yachmennoe (Parpach).

Sources 
 Гриневецкий С. Р., Зонн И. С., Жильцов С. С. Ак-Монайский перешеек // Черноморская энциклопедия. М.: Международные отношения, 2006. — 

Ak-Monay